Luo Chuan-chin is a Taiwanese politician. He was a member of the Legislative Yuan between 1984 and 1996.

His son Lwo Shih-hsiung was a legislator from 2002 to 2008.

References

Living people
Year of birth missing (living people)
Kuomintang Members of the Legislative Yuan in Taiwan
Party List Members of the Legislative Yuan
National Chung Hsing University alumni